Karen Christine Friesicke (11 April 1962 – 25 December 2015) was a German comedian and actress.

Friesicke is best known to German audiences for her TV sketches. In 1996 she joined Ingolf Lück, Anke Engelke, Bastian Pastewka and Marco Rima in a regular nationwide series, the Wochenshow ('The Weekly Show').

Prior to these TV performances, she appeared with Peer Augustinski in the comedy series Harald und Eddi ('Harald and Eddi') with popular nation comic icons Harald Juhnke and Eddi Arent.
She lived in Hamburg with her two sons and was engaged with the Freie Schauspielschule Hamburg ('Hamburg Free Theatre').

According to a January 2016 press report, Karen Friesicke committed suicide.

Filmography (selection)

TV (selection)

Theatre

References

External links

 
 

German women comedians
German film actresses
Actresses from Hamburg
20th-century German actresses
21st-century German actresses
1962 births
2015 deaths
2015 suicides
Suicides in Germany